Nélido Manso López (born December 26, 1966 in Caibarién) is a sailor from Cuba, who represented his country at the Pan American Games, the Central American and Caribbean Games and the Snipe World Championships, winning four medals (three golds -1991, 1995, 1999- and one silver -2003-) at the Pan American Games, one medal (gold -1993-) at the Central American and Caribbean Games, and the Snipe Worlds (1999).

References

External links
 
 

1966 births
Living people
Cuban male sailors (sport)
Pan American Games gold medalists for Cuba
Pan American Games silver medalists for Cuba
Sailors at the 1991 Pan American Games
Sailors at the 1995 Pan American Games
Sailors at the 1999 Pan American Games
Sailors at the 2003 Pan American Games
Snipe class world champions
Pan American Games medalists in sailing
World champions in sailing for Cuba
Central American and Caribbean Games gold medalists for Cuba
Competitors at the 1993 Central American and Caribbean Games
Central American and Caribbean Games medalists in sailing
Medalists at the 1999 Pan American Games
Medalists at the 2003 Pan American Games
People from Caibarién